Anders Lönnbro (10 October 1945 – 8 September 2022) was a Swedish actor. He won the award for Best Actor at the 14th Guldbagge Awards for his role in The Score. He appeared in more than 30 films and television shows since 1978. Lönnbro died on 8 September 2022, at the age of 76.

Selected filmography
 The Score (1978)
 1939 (1989)
 Tjenare kungen (2005)
 Patrik, Age 1.5 (2008)

References

External links

1945 births
2022 deaths
20th-century Swedish male actors
21st-century Swedish male actors
People from Gothenburg
Swedish male film actors
Swedish male television actors